Ventas, Inc. is a real estate investment trust specializing in the ownership and management of health care facilities in the United States, Canada and the United Kingdom.

As of December 2019, the group's portfolio consisted of 1,200 properties divided among nursing homes, medical office buildings, rehabilitation and acute care centres, special care centres, laboratories and research centres and medical-surgical centres for a total value of nearly $25 billion.

As of 2019, it is a Fortune 1000 corporation.

History
The company was founded in 1998 as a spin-off of Vencor, a company founded by Bruce Lunsford, who would later be an unsuccessful Democratic candidate for Governor of Kentucky in 2007 and an unsuccessful candidate for Senator from Kentucky in 2008.

Ventas acquired the real estate investments of Ardent Health Services in 2015. In June 2021, Ventas announced the acquisition of New Senior Investment Group.

References

External links 

Companies listed on the New York Stock Exchange
Health care companies based in Illinois
Real estate investment trusts of the United States
Corporate spin-offs